"The High Life" is a song recorded by American country rap singer Colt Ford and country music singer Chase Rice. It is the first single from Ford's fifth studio album, Thanks for Listening. The song was written by Ford, Rice, Jesse Rice, Zach Crowell and Chris Cline.

Critical reception
In his review for the album, Matt Bjorke of Roughstock gave the song a very positive review, saying that "it has already started to rival some of Colt’s previous big hits (like “Drivin’ Around Song” and “Dirt Road Anthem”).  This one’s all about having a good time with your friends."

Music video
The music video was directed by Scott Hansen and premiered in May 2014.

Chart performance

References

2014 singles
Colt Ford songs
Chase Rice songs
Songs written by Colt Ford
Songs written by Zach Crowell
Average Joes Entertainment singles
2014 songs
Male vocal duets